The 1946-47 Palestine League was the eleventh season of league football in the British Mandate for Palestine. The defending champions were Hapoel Tel Aviv and the championship was won by Maccabi Tel Aviv.

Hapoel Rehovot and Hapoel Herzliya were both relegated, whilst Hakoah Tel Aviv withdrew from league, and in the following month, merged with Hakoah 09 Tel Aviv, which have played in the second tier.

League table

References
RSSSF
Previous seasons The Israel Football Association 

Palestine League seasons
Palestine
1946–47 in Mandatory Palestine football